Shekou Momodou Touray, (born 22 September 1945) is a Sierra Leonean diplomat who served as the Permanent Representative of Sierra Leone to the United Nations.

He was educated at Fourah Bay College, Sierra Leone and at King's College London, graduating with an LLB. 

A legal practitioner, he previously served as a Barrister and Solicitor of the High Court of Sierra Leone. He was a Presidential Appointee to the Law Reform Commission in 2003.

Touray is a member of the Mandingo ethnic group and a native of Bonthe District in southern Sierra Leone. He is married with five children.

References

External links
https://washdiplomat.com/index.php?option=com_content&view=article&id=2771:his-excellency-shekou-momodou-touray&catid=196&Itemid=229
https://web.archive.org/web/20130828081411/http://www.un.int/sierraleone/staff.html
https://web.archive.org/web/20150923205300/http://www.cocorioko.net/?p=332

1945 births
Living people
Fourah Bay College alumni
Alumni of King's College London
Sierra Leonean diplomats
Permanent Representatives of Sierra Leone to the United Nations
People from Bonthe District
Sierra Leonean Mandingo people